Albert Edward Ingham  (3 April 1900 – 6 September 1967) was an English mathematician.

Early life and education
Ingham was born in Northampton. He went to Stafford Grammar School and began his studies at Trinity College, Cambridge in January 1919 after service in the British Army in World War I. Ingham received a distinction as a Wrangler in the Mathematical Tripos at Cambridge. He was elected a fellow of Trinity in 1922. He also received an 1851 Research Fellowship.

Academic career
Ingham was appointed a Reader at the University of Leeds in 1926 and returned to Cambridge as a fellow of King's College and lecturer in 1930. Ingham was appointed after the death of Frank Ramsey.

Ingham supervised the PhDs of C. Brian Haselgrove, Wolfgang Fuchs and Christopher Hooley.

Ingham proved in 1937 that if

for some positive constant c, then

for any θ > (1+4c)/(2+4c). Here ζ denotes the Riemann zeta function and π the prime-counting function.

Using the best published value for c at the time, an immediate consequence of his result was that

gn < pn5/8,

where pn the n-th prime number and gn = pn+1 − pn denotes the n-th prime gap.

Honours
Ingham was elected a Fellow of the Royal Society (FRS) in 1945.

Marriage and children
Ingham married Rose Marie "Jane" TupperCarey in 1932.  They had two sons.

Death
Ingham died in Switzerland in 1967, aged 67.

Publications
Ingham's sole book, On the Distribution of Prime Numbers was published in 1932.

References

1900 births
1967 deaths
20th-century English mathematicians
Academics of the University of Leeds
Alumni of Trinity College, Cambridge
British Army personnel of World War I
Fellows of King's College, Cambridge
Fellows of Trinity College, Cambridge
Fellows of the Royal Society
Number theorists
People from Northampton